Dam-e Abbas (also Romanized as Dam-e ‘Abbās; also known as Qaryeh-ye Dam ‘Abbās) is a village in Doshman Ziari Rural District, in the Central District of Kohgiluyeh County, Kohgiluyeh and Boyer-Ahmad Province, Iran. At the 2006 census, its population was 146, in 27 families.

References 

Populated places in Kohgiluyeh County